Takahiro Nozaki (born 19 November 1974) is a Japanese speed skater. He competed in the men's 5000 metres event at the 1998 Winter Olympics.

References

1974 births
Living people
Japanese male speed skaters
Olympic speed skaters of Japan
Speed skaters at the 1998 Winter Olympics
Sportspeople from Hokkaido
Asian Games gold medalists for Japan
Asian Games medalists in speed skating
Speed skaters at the 2003 Asian Winter Games
Medalists at the 2003 Asian Winter Games